Luchy Donalds (born 1991) is a Nigerian actress who has featured in several Nollywood movies.

Biography 
She was born 28 May 1993 in Owerri, the capital city of Imo State. Her parents are Mr. and Mrs. Donald Nwocha. She is the only daughter and the first of three children, of which two are boys.

Education 
Luchy Donalds attended Mount Camel Premier School for her primary and secondary education. She attended Tansian University, Umunya in Anambra State for her tertiary education where she earned a bachelor's degree in microbiology.

Career 
Luchy Donalds joined Nollywood in 2015 and has featured in various movies. Her first movie The Investigator which was a debut brought her into the limelight in 2015. Subsequently, she acted in several movies with Nollywood actors in the Nigerian Film Industry. she gift herself a car in 2021.

Selected filmography 
Seed of Sorrow (2020)
Royal Sibling (2021)
Lust in Marriage (2021)
Marriage Bride Price (2021)
Songs and Sorrows (2021)
Crazy Fighter (2021)
Trust no one (2021)
Billionaire and his Blind Wives (2021)
Soul on Fire (2021)
The Classic Ladies (2021)
Chef Augusta (2021)
Cheating in Marriage (2021)
At Age 18 (2021)

Awards

References

External links 
The movie LoloO Igwe from Naijapals

Nigerian film actresses
Living people
People from Abia State
1991 births
21st-century Nigerian actresses
Nigerian models
Igbo actresses